Chellala is a district in El Bayadh Province, Algeria. It was named after its capital, Chellala.

Municipalities
The district is further divided into 2 municipalities:
Chellala
El Maharra

Districts of El Bayadh Province